Naib Subedar Bajrang Lal Takhar (born 5 January 1981 in Sikar district, Rajasthan) is an Indian rower who won the first individual rowing Gold medal for India at the 2010 Asian Games held in Guangzhou. Takhar is a Naib Subedar in the Rajputana Rifles regiment of the Indian Army.

Rowing career 

Bajrang Lal won the first individual rowing silver medal for India at the 2006 Asian Games held in Doha He contested in the men's single sculls rowing event at the 2008 Summer Olympics in Beijing, but failed to reach the finals. He finished with a rank of 21.

He then went on to bag gold at the Asian Championships in Korea last year 2007. He won the quota place by winning gold at the Asian qualifying championships in Shanghai.

He has won two gold medals in the single and double scull races in South Asian Games 2006.

In November 2010, he won the first individual rowing Gold medal for India at the 2010 Asian Games held in Guangzhou.

Awards 
 2008 – Arjun Award by Govt of India.
 2013 – Padma Shri India's fourth highest civilian award from the Government of India.

Rowing records 
16/08	Men's Single Sculls Final Ranking	(21st)
15/08	Men's Single Sculls Final D	7:09.73 (3rd)
13/08	Men's Single Sculls Semifinal – Heat 3	7:23.00 (4th)
11/08	Men's Single Sculls Quarterfinal – Heat 4	7:19.01 (5th)
09/08	Men's Single Sculls Preliminary Round – Heat 4	7:39.91 (3rd)

References

External links 
Bajranglal Takhar on Yahoo sports 

Living people
1981 births
Indian male rowers
Sportspeople from Rajasthan
Rajasthani people
Olympic rowers of India
Rowers at the 2008 Summer Olympics
People from Sikar district
Military personnel from Rajasthan
Asian Games gold medalists for India
Asian Games silver medalists for India
Asian Games bronze medalists for India
Asian Games medalists in rowing
Rowers at the 2006 Asian Games
Rowers at the 2010 Asian Games
Rowers at the 2014 Asian Games
Recipients of the Padma Shri in sports
Medalists at the 2006 Asian Games
Medalists at the 2010 Asian Games
Medalists at the 2014 Asian Games
Recipients of the Arjuna Award